Edgecliff Village is a town in Tarrant County, Texas, United States. It is  an enclave suburb of, and surrounded by, Fort Worth. The population was 2,776 at the 2010 census.

Geography
Edgecliff Village is an enclave community of the city of Fort Worth. According to the United States Census Bureau, the town has a total area of 1.2 square miles (3.1 km2), all of it land.

Demographics

2020 census

As of the 2020 United States census, there were 3,788 people, 974 households, and 776 families residing in the town.

2000 census
As of the 2000 census, there were 2,550 people, 997 households, and 772 families residing in the town. The population density was 2,142.5 people per square mile (827.4/km2). There were 1,012 housing units at an average density of 850.3 per square mile (328.3/km2). The racial makeup of the town was 84.20% White, 8.51% African American, 0.43% Native American, 1.10% Asian, 4.00% from other races, and 1.76% from two or more races. Hispanic or Latino of any race were 12.12% of the population.

There were 997 households, out of which 23.2% had children under the age of 18 living with them, 66.0% were married couples living together, 8.5% had a female householder with no husband present, and 22.5% were non-families. 19.5% of all households were made up of individuals, and 10.5% had someone living alone who was 65 years of age or older. The average household size was 2.56 and the average family size was 2.93.

In the town, the population was spread out, with 20.9% under the age of 18, 6.5% from 18 to 24, 19.5% from 25 to 44, 33.5% from 45 to 64, and 19.6% who were 65 years of age or older. The median age was 47 years. For every 100 females, there were 91.3 males. For every 100 females age 18 and over, there were 88.6 males.

The median income for a household in the town was $58,304, and the median income for a family was $61,607. Males had a median income of $40,189 versus $30,682 for females. The per capita income for the town was $24,836. About 2.9% of families and 5.8% of the population were below the poverty line, including 11.3% of those under age 18 and 6.0% of those age 65 or over.

Economy
The town of Edgecliff Village is experiencing a growth spurt, as the remaining  of open prairie are developed for building single-family homes. After this area is built out, there is little open land for housing in the town. This area was held for many years by and purchased from the Hunt family of Texas.

The location of Edgecliff Village is convenient to Interstate 35W and Interstate 20 (also Loop I-820). The largest business in the town is the Fort Worth Star-Telegram, which maintains a printing plant within city limits. The tax rate in Edgecliff Village is lower than in surrounding communities, however, there are few amenities (that is, no public library or park development).

Education
Edgecliff Village is served by the Crowley and Fort Worth Independent School Districts.

References

Dallas–Fort Worth metroplex
Towns in Tarrant County, Texas
Towns in Texas
Enclaves in the United States